The Atlantic Accord is an agreement signed in 1985 between the Government of Canada and the Government of Newfoundland and Labrador to manage offshore oil and gas resources adjacent to Newfoundland and Labrador.

The name was also used to describe a 2005 cash transfer agreement between the Government of Canada and the governments of Nova Scotia and Newfoundland and Labrador.

References

Energy treaties
Treaties of Canada
Petroleum industry in Canada
Treaties concluded in 2005
Politics of Newfoundland and Labrador
Politics of Nova Scotia